Benzyl acetate is an organic ester with the molecular formula . It is formed by the condensation of benzyl alcohol and acetic acid.

Similar to most other esters, it possesses a sweet and pleasant aroma, owing to which, it finds applications in personal hygiene and health care products. It is a constituent of jasmin and of the essential oils of ylang-ylang and neroli. It has pleasant sweet aroma reminiscent of jasmine. Further as a flavoring agent it is also used to impart jasmine or apple flavors to various cosmetics and personal care products like lotions, hair creams etc..

It is one of many compounds that is attractive to males of various species of orchid bees. It is collected and used by the bees as an intra-specific pheromone; In apiculture benzyl acetate is used as a bait to collect bees. Natural sources of benzyl acetate include varieties of flowers like jasmine (Jasminum), and fruits like pear, apple, etc.

References

External links

Perfume ingredients
Flavors
Insect pheromones
IARC Group 3 carcinogens
Acetate esters
Benzyl esters
Sweet-smelling chemicals